Epistrophy may refer to:
Epistrophy (composition), a jazz standard composed by Thelonious Monk and Kenny Clarke in 1941
 Epistrophy (Ran Blake album), a 1991 album by Ran Blake
 Epistrophy (Steve Lacy album), a 1969 album by Steve Lacy
 Epistrophy & Now's the Time, a 1972 live album by Richard Davis also known as Epistrophy
 Epistrophy (Charlie Rouse album), a 1988 album by Charlie Rouse

See also
 Epistrophe, the repetition of the same word or words at the end of successive phrases, clauses or sentences